The Arthur G. James Cancer Hospital and Richard J. Solove Research Institute (commonly shortened to just The James) is part of The Ohio State University and one of the 45 National Comprehensive Cancer hospitals. It is named after Arthur G. James, the founder, who desired a cancer hospital in Columbus, Ohio, United States. 

The hospital conducts treatments for cancer, and conducts research in the Solove Research Institute. The James receives donations through the Pelotonia biking event. In 2018, the James Cancer Hospital was designated a magnet hospital by the American Nurses Credentialing Center. With the recent expansion in 2014, it is now the third largest cancer hospital in the United States. Despite sizable fundraising efforts and recognition in Central Ohio, U.S. News & World Report ranked the hospital as the 30th best cancer hospital in the United States in 2020.

History
The ground breaking for the hospital was July 10, 1984. It was completed January 16, 1990 but a water main break delayed the opening until July 9, 1990, when the first patient was admitted.

Work
The hospital supports the Human Tissue Resource Network by housing a constitute organization called the Tissue Procurement Shared Resources.

New hospital and expansion
In December 2014, The James opened a new hospital. With more than 1.1 million square feet, and 21 floors, "the New James" is now the third largest cancer hospital in the country. Designed by Architecture Firm, HOK, the construction project broke ground in 2010 and was the largest development project in The Ohio State University's history. The cost of construction was $1.1 billion. Every inpatient floor specializes in specific cancer sub-types, has dedicated areas for education as well as a translational research lab.

Emergency department
The James also has its own 15 bed emergency department that is strictly for cancer patients. It is fully integrated with the OSU Wexner Medical Center ER Department.

References

External links
 

Hospital buildings completed in 1990
Hospital buildings completed in 2014
Hospitals in Columbus, Ohio
Buildings and structures in Columbus, Ohio
Colleges, schools, and departments of Ohio State University
Cancer hospitals
NCI-designated cancer centers
Skyscrapers in Columbus, Ohio
Skyscrapers in Ohio